USA-256, also known as GPS IIF-7, GPS SVN-68 and NAVSTAR 71, is an American navigation satellite which forms part of the Global Positioning System. It was the seventh of twelve Block IIF satellites to be launched.

Launch 
Built by Boeing and launched by United Launch Alliance, USA-256 was launched at 03:23 UTC on 2 August 2014, atop an Atlas V 401 carrier rocket, vehicle number AV-048. The launch took place from Space Launch Complex 41 at the Cape Canaveral Air Force Station, and placed USA-256 directly into medium Earth orbit.

Orbit 
It is used to broadcast the PRN 09 signal, and operates in slot 6 of plane F of the GPS constellation.
 It is currently in service following commissioning on September 17, 2014.

References 

Spacecraft launched in 2014
GPS satellites
USA satellites
Spacecraft launched by Atlas rockets